The statue of Theodor Mommsen by Adolf Brütt is located at Humboldt University of Berlin in Berlin-Mitte, Germany.

References

External links 
 

Humboldt University of Berlin
Statues in Berlin
Outdoor sculptures in Berlin
Sculptures of men in Germany
Statues in Germany